An African Championship is a top level international sports competition between African athletes or sports teams representing their respective countries or professional sports clubs.

List of Championships 
Athletics
African Championships in Athletics
African Junior Athletics Championships
African Youth Athletics Championships
African Cross Country Championships
African Combined Events Championships (decathlon and heptathlon)

Badminton
African Badminton Championships

Basketball
FIBA Africa Championship
FIBA Africa Under-20 Championship
FIBA Africa Under-18 Championship
FIBA Africa Under-16 Championship
FIBA Africa Under-20 Championship for Women
FIBA Africa Under-18 Championship for Women
FIBA Africa Under-16 Championship for Women

Boxing
African Amateur Boxing Championships

Chess
African Chess Championship

Cricket
ICC Africa Under-19 Championships

Field hockey
Men's Hockey Africa Cup of Nations
Women's Hockey Africa Cup of Nations

Football
Africa Cup of Nations
African Women's Championship
African Nations Championship
CAF U-23 Championship
African Youth Championship
African U-17 Championship
African U-20 Women's World Cup qualification
African U-17 Cup of Nations for Women
FIFA Beach Soccer World Cup qualification (CAF)

Futsal
African Futsal Championship

Handball
African Men's Handball Championship
African Women's Handball Championship

Martial arts
African Judo Championships

Motor sport
African Rally Championship

Swimming
African Swimming Championships

Volleyball
Men's African Volleyball Championship
Women's Africa Volleyball Championship U20
African Volleyball Championship U19
Girl's Africa Volleyball Championship U18

See also 
 African Games, a multi-sport event between competitors from all nations in Africa
 Championship
 World championship
 Asian Championship
 European Championship
 European Junior Championships (disambiguation)
 Oceania Championship
 Pan American Championship
 Central American Championships (disambiguation)
 North American Championship
 Canadian Championships
 South American Championship